Ulrich III, Duke of Mecklenburg or Ulrich III of Mecklenburg-Güstrow (5 March 1527 – 14 March 1603) was Duke of Mecklenburg (-Güstrow) from 1555-56 to 1603.

Early life
Ulrich was the third son of Duke Albrecht VII and Anna of Brandenburg.  Ulrich was educated at the Bavarian court. Later, he studied theology and law in Ingolstadt.  After the death of his father, he took up residence in Bützow and succeeded his cousin Duke Magnus III of Mecklenburg-Schwerin as Lutheran administrator of the Prince-Bishopric of Schwerin in 1550.  Later, he married Magnus's widow, Elizabeth, a daughter of King Frederick I of Denmark. His wife was actually a first cousin of his maternal grandmother Elizabeth of Denmark, daughter of John, King of Denmark. They were first cousins, twice removed. After the death of Elizabeth he married Anna, daughter of Philip I, Duke of Pomerania.

After the death of his uncle, Henry V, Duke of Mecklenburg, Ulrich participated in the national government, especially during Mecklenburg's participation in the Schmalkaldic War.  It erupted from an inheritance dispute, which was settled by the "Ruppiner dictum" of the Elector of Brandenburg.

Reign
On 17 February 1555, Ulrich succeeded his brother John Albert I in partitioned Mecklenburg-Güstrow. In 1556, he received, while maintaining common state government with his brother, the eastern part of Mecklenburg with the capital in Güstrow, while John Albert received the western part with the residence Schwerin.  After the death of his brother in 1576, Ulrich was made guardian of his offspring, among them his nephew and successor in Güstrow John Albert II.  Ulrich built the castle at Güstrow as his principal residence.  

Ulrich embodied an educated, modern prince, and was a devout Lutheran.  He developed into one of the leading princes of  the Mecklenburg dynasty.  He left behind, at his death, a fortune of about 200,000 guilders.  Ulrich participated in the exchange with Tycho Brahe and David Chytraeus in the scientific discourse of his time and corresponded with humanists like Heinrich Rantzau. In 1594, as Chief of Lower Saxony imperial circle, he organized military and financial assistance against the Turkish threat. 

In the dispute between Frederick II of Denmark and his brother-in-law Duke John Adolf, Duke of Holstein-Gottorp Ulrich served as a mediator, having excellent relations to both. As Administrator of the Prince-Bishopric of Schwerin he was succeeded by his grandson the last Bishop of Schleswig, Prince Ulrich of Denmark (30 December 1578 – 27 March 1624 in Rühn), who married with Lady Catherine Hahn-Hinrichshagen.

Ulrich's granddaughter Anne of Denmark married James VI of Scotland. In 1598 James VI was anxious to secure the throne of England. He sent his ambassadors to his wife's family and allies, to discuss his right to Elizabeth's throne and that the Princes of Europe should supported him against Spanish claims, with military help if required. Ulrich wrote to James on 20 August with a letter of cautious support, counselling that Elizabeth should name him her successor, and was lukewarm on a definite pledge of arms.

Family
Ulrich's only child from his marriage to Elizabeth of Denmark, Sophie, married King Frederick II of Denmark. Through her, Ulrich was a grandfather to Christian IV of Denmark and a great-grandfather of Charles I of England.

References

1527 births
1603 deaths
House of Mecklenburg-Schwerin
People from Schwerin
Ulrich 01
Dukes of Mecklenburg-Güstrow